Genitoconi is a genus of cavibelonian solenogasters, shell-less, worm-like mollusks.

References

Pholidoskepia